Hamatastus conspectus is a species of longhorn beetle in the family Cerambycidae. It was described by Monné in 1895.

References

Acanthocinini
Beetles described in 1895